Maximilian Karner (born 3 January 1990) is an Austrian footballer who currently plays as a defender for UFC Siezenheim.

Club career
Karner started his career in 2005 in Red Bull Salzburg. In 2010, he moved to SV Ried, but in the same year he was loaned to SV Grödig. In June 2011 he came back to SV Ried. In 2013, he signed one-year deal with SV Grödig.

On 6 July 2015, Karner signed two-year deal with Levski Sofia in Bulgaria. He made his Levski debut against Botev Plovdiv on 18 July, starting as a centre back in a 1–1 league draw.

On 19 August 2016, Karner signed a short-term deal until the end of the season at Derry City where he linked up with former teammate Lukas Schubert. He made his debut for the club in a 2-2 draw with Bray Wanderers at the Carlisle Grounds on 27 August 2016.

Statistics
As of 1 July 2016

References

1990 births
Living people
Austrian footballers
Austrian Football Bundesliga players
First Professional Football League (Bulgaria) players
League of Ireland players
SV Ried players
SV Grödig players
PFC Levski Sofia players
Derry City F.C. players
Expatriate footballers in Bulgaria
Association football defenders